Dante most commonly refers to Dante Alighieri (1265–1321), a 13th–14th century Florentine poet.

Dante may also refer to:

Places
 Dante (crater), a lunar crater
 Dante (Turin Metro), a station of the Turin Metro
 Dante, South Dakota, a town in South Dakota
 Dante, Virginia
 Dante Park, a park in New York City
 Hafun, a town in Somalia known as Dante during Italian colonial rule

People
 Dante (name), a given name and surname (and list of people with that name)

Art, entertainment, and media

Fictional entities
 Dante (Devil May Cry), the protagonist of the video game franchise Devil May Cry
 Dante (The Walking Dead), a fictional character from The Walking Dead 
 Dante, the unstable and largely inaccessible star system serving as the Marauder base in Independence War 2: Edge of Chaos
 Dante, the leader of the Mountain Men in The 100 TV series
 Dante Hicks, a character in the View Askewniverse series created by writer/director Kevin Smith, portrayed by actor Brian O'Halloran
 Dante, the dog from the 2017 film Coco
 Dante, an antagonist of Hypixel Skyblock, who has been taken down by Technoblade and his supporters

Music
 Danté and The Evergreens, an American pop group in 1960
 Dante Sonata, a piano sonata in one movement, completed by composer Franz Liszt in 1849
 Dante Symphony, a symphony to Dante's Divine Commedia composed by Franz Liszt
 Dante (album), an album by Show Luo
 Dante XXI, a 2006 album by Brazilian thrash metal band Sepultura

Other arts, entertainment, and media
 Dante (opera), an 1890 opera by Benjamin Godard
 Dante (TV series), a 1960–61 NBC crime drama

Horse related
 Dante (horse), a British Thoroughbred racehorse
 Dante Stakes, a horse race in Great Britain

Ships
 Italian battleship Dante Alighieri
 SS Dante Alighieri, ocean liner

Other uses 
 DANTE, the Delivery of Advanced Network Technology to Europe, a computer networking organisation
 Dante (bar), a cafe and bar in New York City
Dante (networking), a commercial Audio over Ethernet protocol
 Dante (typeface), a typeface designed by Giovanni Mardersteig
 Deutschsprachige Anwendervereinigung TeX (Dante e. V.), the German-language TeX users group
 X-chair, also known as a Dante chair

See also
 Dante's Inferno (disambiguation)